This is a list of supermarket chains in Latvia.

Former operations 
Selver (operated in Latvia 2008–2009)
Prisma (closed the stores in Latvia 2017)
Cento (renamed IKI Cento)
Nelda (renamed IKI Nelda)
IKI (renamed Mego)
Supernetto (renamed Rimi)
Citymarket (renamed Rimi)
T-Market (renamed Maxima)
Saulīte (renamed Maxima)
Saules veikals (renamed Elvi)

References 

Supermarkets
Supermarkets
Latvia